Voting matters was a peer-reviewed academic journal whose purpose is "To advance the understanding of preferential voting systems". Originally published by the Electoral Reform Society (1994–2003), Voting matters then became a publication of the McDougall Trust until April, 2013. The journal's founding editor-in-chief (1994–2010) was British mathematician and computer scientist Brian Wichmann, followed by Nicolaus Tideman.

The majority of Voting matters papers dealt with the single transferable vote (STV) preferential voting system. The journal has also republished several seminal papers on STV by Thomas Hare, Henry Richmond Droop, and Brian Meek. Other papers, such as "Four Condorcet-Hare Hybrid Methods for Single-Winner
Elections", dealt with hybrid voting methods that partially incorporate STV.

External links 
 
 McDougall Trust

Single transferable vote
Open access journals
English-language journals
Publications established in 1994
Political science journals